Ujna is a genus of leafhoppers belonging to the family Cicadellidae, subfamily Mileewinae. They are known from India, Madagascar and Seychelles.

Species
Some species of this genus are:
 
 Ujna acuta Krishnankutty & Dietrich, 2011
 Ujna affinis Krishnankutty & Dietrich, 2011
 Ujna alba Krishnankutty & Dietrich, 2011
 Ujna bimaculata Krishnankutty & Dietrich, 2011
 Ujna bicolorata  Rao 1995 
 Ujna consors  Distant 1908 
 Ujna delicatula  Distant, 1908
 Ujna exigua  Melichar 1903 
 Ujna flavidipes  Distant, 1917
 Ujna gagatina  Melichar 1903 
 Ujna maolanana Yang & Li 2000 
 Ujna philippinensis  Baker 1914
 Ujna rostrata Krishnankutty & Dietrich, 2011
 Ujna trishula Krishnankutty & Dietrich, 2011
 Ujna variabilis Krishnankutty & Dietrich, 2011

References

Cicadellidae genera
Auchenorrhyncha genera
Insects of India